Alex Walker (born 18 February 1984 in Sydney, Australia) is a rugby union hooker or prop for Esher in the Aviva Championship.

Although Walker started playing in his native Australia and has represented the Australia national under-21 rugby union team, he is qualified to play for England.

Walker joined the Newcastle Falcons in the Summer of 2009 from Saracens.

Trivia
His father Roger Walker is a former IFBB Mr. Universe. He won that title in 1976.

References

Saracens F.C. players
Rugby union hookers
1984 births
Living people
Newcastle Falcons players
Esher RFC players
Rugby union players from Sydney